Luis Horna and Potito Starace were the defending champions, but lost in the first round to James Cerretani and Victor Hănescu.

James Cerretani and Victor Hănescu won in the final 6–3, 7–5, against Lucas Arnold Ker and Olivier Rochus.

Seeds

Draw

Draw

External links
Draw

Doubles